The Marori is an of the ethnic group who inhabit the southern coastal area of Merauke Regency precisely in Kampung Wasur, Merauke District. This ethnic group bears many similarities to the larger Marind and is sometimes considered a sub-ethnic of the Marind.

Language

Morori or also called Marori, Moaraeri, Moraori, Morari, is a dying Papuan language from a branch of the Kolopom language family which is a branch of Trans–New Guinea language family. This language is separated from the other Kolopom languages, namely the distinct Marind family.  All speakers using this language also use Papuan Malay and Indonesian as a second language, and many also speak Marind.

The dialect that became extinct in 1997, Menge, is remembered for its ceremonial use.

Morori language is spoken in Wasur Village, which in 2010 had a population of 413 peoples (98 families) and 119 Morori people (52 Morori families).

Culture

Kolut pere
The local knowledge of the Marori people on how to honor their ancestral track record starts with the pere kolut. Kolut pere is a term in Marori of two names, the first one being related to the mound of jungle fowl. This type of chicken is known to have two types by the Marori people, namely yanggam and kata.

There are no specific relationship markers related to local knowledge about this animal but this mound or other term for its nest is commonly used as a symbol for local knowledge. This term refers to two main things, kolut pere as a jungle fowl nest and kolut pere as an ancestral track record.

Sar
The Marori in Kampung Wasur, Merauke Regency, South Papua Province, has a tradition known as sar.

In contrast to other local wisdom practices, sar is performed as a symbol of respect for relatives or family in the Marori tribe who have died. In practice, SAR is a prohibition on the use of fishery resources in river or swamp for 1,000 days.

Sar has a procession that is carried out in several stages. The first ritual in the sar procession is called wuyuw. The bereaved family wore bracelets as a sign of starting a week-long ritual of abstinence. In the local language, people call the bracelet ureuw.

From these several stages, there are several things that can be explained, such as the ritual of abstinence. This ritual begins by saying a promise to carry out abstinence at the tomb of a deceased family. Initial abstinence is performed after 40 days of mourning, by not eating fish or meat related to totem family members. On the same day, the family will install forbidden wood (yarauw) to catch fish in the agreed river or swamp. This procession is called yemu.

On the way home after saying the promise, another ritual that must be carried out is terfenjeuw. The family sowed leaves to cover the traces of family members who had died. It is intended that the family forgive the departure of family members who have died.

After a week, the bracelet or ureuw is released by holding a ritual. Living family members are in charge of preparing previously forbidden food and drinks. The ritual of releasing the bracelet is carried out at the home of the bereaved family.

Garden produce such as banana, sugarcane, areca nut, betel, and others, become a customary item that has been agreed to be provided in the bracelet release ritual. Sago and other tubers are processed traditionally by the stone-burning method. This procession is known as sep. The family wearing the bracelet sits in a circle during the September ritual.

Before removing the bracelet, the family prepares a coconut. Then the coconut is split as a symbol of the end of the period of abstinence. Coconut water is then sprinkled around the family members. Then, each family member tasted the pre-agreed taboos. This process is done alternately. One member of the family is in charge of giving dishes that are forbidden to other family members.

A week after the bracelet release procession, the family returns to sowing leaves in places that have passed by family members who have died, such as in forests, swamps, or places of work.

The next procession is called ureuw wogib. The ropes used when carrying out abstinence are stored in sago forests or swamps that have been agreed upon as sars. In this procession, only certain family members are appointed to keep the ropes and no other members of the Marori tribe are involved.

The last procession is the yarauw onggi traditional party. This party marks the lifting of the ban on taking fishery resources for 1,000 days or known as yarauw onggi. The wood that is the symbol of the prohibition will be revoked.

There are no severe sanctions for someone who violates the SAR. The sanctions given are only in the form of a warning or obligation to cover the needs needed during the Yarauw Onggi traditional party. For example, by donating bananas, tubers, sago, or animal.

See also

Indigenous people of New Guinea

References

Indigenous ethnic groups in Western New Guinea
Ethnic groups in Indonesia
Ethnic groups in South Papua
Merauke Regency